Tissue factor pathway inhibitor (or TFPI) is a single-chain polypeptide which can reversibly inhibit factor Xa (Xa). While Xa is inhibited, the Xa-TFPI complex can subsequently also inhibit the FVIIa-tissue factor complex.
TFPI contributes significantly to the inhibition of Xa in vivo, despite being present at concentrations of only 2.5 nM.

Genetics
The gene for TFPI is located on chromosome 2q31-q32.1, and has nine exons which span 70 kb. A similar gene, termed TFPI2, has been identified on chromosome 7, at locus 7q21.3; in addition to TFPI activity, its product also has retinal pigment epithelial cell growth-promoting properties.

Protein structure
TFPI has a relative molecular mass of 34,000 to 40,000 depending on the degree of proteolysis of the C-terminal region.

TFPI consists of a highly negatively charged amino-terminus, three tandemly linked Kunitz domains, and a highly positively charged carboxy-terminus. With its Kunitz domains, TFPI exhibits significant homology with human inter-alpha-trypsin inhibitor and bovine basic pancreatic trypsin inhibitor.

Interactions
Tissue factor pathway inhibitor has been shown to interact with Factor X.

See also
 Hemostasis

References

External links
  (TFPI1),  (TFPI2)

Further reading

Coagulation system